The 2021 Union Omaha season was the second season in the soccer team's history, and their second season in the third division of American soccer, USL League One. Union Omaha played the majority of their home games at Werner Park, located in Papillion, Nebraska, United States, with one game played at Creighton University's Morrison Stadium.

Union Omaha finished the regular season in first place, finishing with the league's best goal difference, earning home field advantage and a first-round bye in the USL League One Playoffs.  Union Omaha finished the season winning their first ever championship, beating defending champion Greenville Triumph SC 3–0 in the final.

Roster

Following the completion of Union Omaha's inaugural season, head coach Jay Mims announced 14 players would return for the 2021 season.  The team's first new signings were announced on January 22, as Conor Doyle and Greg Hurst were signed as free agents from the Chattanooga Red Wolves.  Goalkeeper Kevin Piedrahita and defender Blake Malone joined the team as a free agent and on loan, respectively, before the start of training camp.

Competitions

Exhibitions

USL League One

Standings

Results summary

Results by round

Match results

USL League One Playoffs

Statistics

Appearances and goals

Numbers after plus–sign (+) denote appearances as a substitute.

Disciplinary record
{| class="wikitable" style="text-align:center;"
|-
| rowspan="2" !width=15|
| rowspan="2" !width=15|
| rowspan="2" !width=120|Player
| colspan="3"|USL1
| colspan="3"|Total
|-
!width=34; background:#fe9;|
!width=34; background:#fe9;|
!width=34; background:#ff8888;|
!width=34; background:#fe9;|
!width=34; background:#fe9;|
!width=34; background:#ff8888;|
|-
|| 2 || MF ||align=left|   Emir Alihodžić
|| 4 || 0 || 0 || 4 || 0 || 0
|-
|| 3 || DF ||align=left|  Damià Viader
|| 4 || 0 || 0 || 4 || 0 || 0
|-
|| 4 || DF ||align=left|  Jaime Ponce
|| 0 || 0 || 0 || 0 || 0 || 0
|-
|| 5 || MF ||align=left|  Tobias Otieno
|| 6 || 0 || 0 || 6 || 0 || 0
|-
|| 7 || FW ||align=left|  Ethan Vanacore-Decker
|| 1 || 0 || 0 || 1 || 0 || 0
|-
|| 8 || MF ||align=left|  John Murphy
|| 1 || 0 || 0 || 1 || 0 || 0
|-
|| 9 || FW ||align=left|  Greg Hurst
|| 6 || 0 || 0 || 6 || 0 || 0
|-
|| 10 || MF ||align=left|  Nicolas Firmino
|| 3 || 0 || 0 || 3 || 0 || 0
|-
|| 11 || FW ||align=left|  Evan Conway
|| 1 || 1 || 0 || 1 || 1 || 0
|-
|| 12 || MF ||align=left|  Austin Panchot
|| 1 || 0 || 0 || 1 || 0 || 0
|-
|| 13 || DF ||align=left|  Daltyn Knutson
|| 2 || 0 || 0 || 2 || 0 || 0
|-
|| 14 || MF ||align=left|  Christian Molina
|| 0 || 0 || 0 || 0 || 0 || 0
|-
|| 15 || FW ||align=left|  Elma N'For
|| 1 || 0 || 0 || 1 || 0 || 0
|-
|| 16 || DF ||align=left|  Jacob Crull
|| 2 || 0 || 0 || 2 || 0 || 0
|-
|| 17 || MF ||align=left|  JP Scearce
|| 5 || 0 || 1 || 5 || 0 || 1
|-
|| 18 || DF ||align=left|  Blake Malone
|| 1 || 0 || 0 || 1 || 0 || 0
|-
|| 19 || FW ||align=left|  Ricardo Rivera
|| 0 || 0 || 0 || 0 || 0 || 0
|-
|| 20 || MF ||align=left|  Devin Boyce
|| 3 || 0 || 0 || 3 || 0 || 0
|-
|| 22 || MF ||align=left|  Conor Doyle
|| 6 || 0 || 0 || 6 || 0 || 0
|-
|| 24 || GK ||align=left|  Rashid Nuhu
|| 1 || 0 || 0 || 1 || 0 || 0
|-
|| 25 || DF ||align=left|  Ferrety Sousa
|| 7 || 0 || 0 || 7 || 0 || 0
|-
|| 28 || DF ||align=left|  Illal Osumanu
|| 1 || 0 || 0 || 1 || 0 || 0
|-
|| 30 || MF ||align=left|  Yoskar Galvan-Mercado
|| 0 || 0 || 0 || 0 || 0 || 0
|-
|| 33 || GK ||align=left|  Kevin Piedrahita
|| 0 || 0 || 0 || 0 || 0 || 0
|-
!colspan="3"|Total !! 56 !! 1 !! 1 !! 56 !! 1 !! 1

References

Union Omaha
Union Omaha
Union Omaha